Joseph Augustus (15 November 1898 – 12 May 1975) was a Belgian footballer. He played in five matches for the Belgium national football team from 1921 to 1925.

References

External links
 

1898 births
1975 deaths
Belgian footballers
Belgium international footballers
Place of birth missing
Association football midfielders